The sprint medley relay (SMR) is a track and field event in which teams of four athletes compete over sprinting distances as part of a relay race. Unlike most track relays, each member of the team runs a different distance. The sprint medley is rather uncommon, run most frequently at non-championship track meets which are focused on relays.  Since these are not championship events, specific criteria for the event are not in common rulebooks.  This leads to localized variations.

Sprint medley usually consists of two shorter sprints, followed by two single longer events.  Usual conduct for safety is to run the shorter events first, in lanes to allow faster moving sprinters to exchange without interference.  And faster moving athletes will have a more consistent tempo to prepare a handoff than with longer sprinters who are more prone to decelerate inconsistently as they finish their leg.  By running two shorter sprints, mathematically the events can be conducted over an even number of laps.

Variations
Common lengths of the race could be 800 meters or 1600 meters.  The 800 meters variation usually would be two 100 meters legs, a 200 meters leg and a 400 meters leg.  The 800 meter version is sometimes referred to as the Super Sprint Medley Relay to distinguish it from the longer version.  More commonly, the 800 meters version is distinguished by abbreviated leg numbers (1-1-2-4).  The events are usually not referred to by their cumulative distance as that would tend to indicate 4 legs of the same distance.  The 1600 meters variation usually would be two 200 meters legs, a 400 meters leg and an 800 meters leg.  It would be named numerically (2-2-4-8).  Some have done a 1000 meters variation, which does not fit into an even number of laps, running a 100 meters leg, a 200 meters leg, a 300 meters leg and a 400 meters leg.  The (1-2-3-4) format is referred to as the Swedish relay.  At some youth level meets, where the handoff is not as refined, the 400 meters leg has been conducted first.  This is consistent with a related event, the Distance medley relay which starts with a longer race.  At a higher level of athlete, this would put handoffs for short sprinting legs into theoretical common passing zones unless the track is specifically marked with the 4 turn stagger required to run a 4 x 200 meters relay entirely in lanes.  Short sprinters moving around in a common passing zone at the last moment is a potentially chaotic situation.

Conduct
The descriptions below describe how to conduct the variations of the event using commonly available markings.  It is assumed 4 turn staggers are not common, and even if they are marked, appropriate passing zones are not marked for the (1-1-2-4) version using either a 4 turn or 3 turn stagger.  So these descriptions use a standard 2 turn stagger, causing the athletes to break to the inside following the exchange at the end of the first lap.  Colors mentioned are specific only if the track is marked following rulebook recommendations.  Since they are only recommendations in the rulebook, some tracks choose to paint their lines using localized color schemes.

1-1-2-4
The start and first two legs are conducted identical to a 4x100 meters relay, using the same passing zones, these would be colored yellow.  The third leg of 200 meters would skip the third 4x100 zone and handoff at the blue 4x400 meters relay passing zone.  Because the incoming leg is running 200 meters, the outgoing 400 meters leg is allowed to use the acceleration zone before the pass.  After receiving the baton, the final leg would break to the inside as in a 4x400 race on a 2 turn stagger.

2-1-1-4
Some might choose to run the 200 meter leg first, inverting the skipped zone on the first lap from the third zone to the first zone.

2-2-4-8
The race would start the same as a 4x400 on the white/blue/white lines, but since the first two athletes are doing 200 meters, would skip the first and third exchange zones used in the 4x100, only using the yellow second zone half way around the track.  On an indoor 200 meter track, this would be conducted in exactly the same fashion as an outdoor 4x400, with the runners breaking to the inside following the first lap, except the athletes would be allowed to use the acceleration zone.  On an outdoor track, the third runner would exchange in the standard blue 4x400 zone and would then break to run in lane one at the green break line at the beginning of the back straight (500m into the race).  The final exchange would also be like a 4x400 exchange, but the final runner would do an 800 meters (This race is sometimes run in reverse order, beginning with the 800 meter leg, followed by the 400 leg, and then finishing with the two 200 meter legs).

All-time top 25

Men (1-1-2-4)

Women (1-1-2-4)

Men (2-2-4-8)

Women (2-2-4-8)

See also
 Distance medley relay
 Swedish relay

References

Track relay races
Athletics (track and field) competitions
Running by type
Athletics by type
Events in track and field